Deh-e Sheykh (also Romanized as Deh Sheykh) is a village in Satar Rural District, Kolyai District, Sonqor County, Kermanshah Province, Iran. At the 2006 census, its population was 211, in 54 families.

References 

Populated places in Sonqor County